The Ballads Collection is a compilation album released by the funk group Cameo in 1998.

Track listing
 "Why Have I Lost You" – 4:43 - Blackmon
 "Sparkle" – 4:51 - Blackmon, Lockett
 "It's Over" – 4:16 - Blackmon, Jenkins, Leftenant
 "Feel Me" – 6:08 - Blackmon, Lockett
 "We All Know Who We Are" – 5:52 - Blackmon
 "Hangin' Downtown" – 5:06 - Hairston
 "Love You Anyway" – 4:49 - Singleton, Wells
 "Don't Be Lonely" – 5:14 - Blackmon, Jenkins, Kendrick, Morris
 "I Owe It All to You" – 2:54 - Blackmon
 "I'll Always Stay" – 3:52 - Blackmon, Lockett
 "I Never Knew" – 4:36 - Blackmon, Lockett
 "Why Have I Lost You" – 5:14 - Blackmon

References

Cameo (band) compilation albums
1998 compilation albums